William Rast is an American clothing line founded by Justin Timberlake and Trace Ayala. It is most known for their premium jeans. On October 17, 2006, Justin Timberlake and Trace Ayala put on their first fashion show to launch their new William Rast clothing line. The label also produces other clothing items such as jackets and tops. The company started first as a denim line, later evolving into a men's and women's clothing line.

William Rast name

The name "William Rast" is a combination of Timberlake's grandfather's first name and Ayala's grandfather's last name.

Brand

William Rast denim has a signature embroidery on the back pockets that resembles a "V" with a slash across it.

William Rast Jeans can be seen on almost every episode of CW's Privileged worn by Joanna Garcia, who was engaged to co-founder Trace Ayala until early 2009.

Johan & Marcella Lindeberg are the creative directors for William Rast.

In early 2011, the company formed a limited-time partnership with Target.

William Rast also sponsored the #98 Bryan Herta Autosport/Curb-Agajanian Motorsports IndyCar of Dan Wheldon which won the 2011 Indianapolis 500.
Colin Dyne one of the founders was instrumental in taking the company public and launching William Rast into the Indianapolis 500 win in 2011.
Colin Dyne later transacted with Tengram partners and the company was effectively sold.

Webshorts / Trailers
In 2008, throughout the month of September, Timberlake starred as the fictional William Rast alongside supermodel Erin Wasson in a series of webshorts. They ranged in time from about 15 seconds to a minute and 45 seconds.

Trailer 1: William Rast and his girlfriend are shown getting their mugshots.

Trailer 2: Rast's girlfriend takes a video of Rast, seemingly drunk and smoking, telling "girls and boys" to always listen to their elders. Rast then takes the camera from his girlfriend, asking how much she loves him. They end up kissing passionately.

Trailer 3: Rast and his girlfriend are shown simply sitting on their porch.

Stores
 Westfield Century City -- Los Angeles
 Broadway -- New York, NY

References

External links
 Official site

Justin Timberlake
Jeans
Companies that filed for Chapter 11 bankruptcy in 2021